Jainism in Pakistan has an extensive heritage and history, with several ancient Jain shrines scattered across the country. Baba Dharam Dass was a holy man whose tomb is located near the bank of a creek called (Deoka or Deokay or Degh) near Chawinda Phatic, behind the agricultural main office in Pasrur, near the city of Sialkot in Punjab, Pakistan. Another prominent Jain monk of the region was Vijayanandsuri of Gujranwala, whose samadhi (memorial shrine) still stands in the city.

Demographics

The presence of Pakistani Buddhists in modern Pakistan is unclear. Prior to 1947, there were Punjabi, Marwadi and Gujarati communities of Jains in the Punjab and Sindh regions. All of them migrated to India during the partition in 1947, thus ending the thousands of years of presence of jainism in the region.

Bhabra (or Bhabhra) is an ancient merchant community from Punjab which mainly follows Jainism.

The original home region of the Bhabras is now in Pakistan. While practically all the Bhabras have left Pakistan, many cities still have sections named after Bhabras.

 Sialkot: All the Jains here were Bhabra and mainly lived in Sialkot and Pasrur. The Serai Bhabrian and Bhabrian Wala localities are named after them. There were several Jain temples here before partition of India.
 Pasrur: Pasrur was developed by a Jain zamindar who was granted land by Raja Maan Singh. Baba Dharam Dass belonged to the zamindar family who was murdered on a trading visit.
 Gujranwala: Two old Jain libraries managed by Lala Karam Chand Bhabra were present here which were visited by Ramkrishna Gopal Bhandarkar.
 Lahore: There were Jain temples at localities still called Thari Bhabrian and Gali Bhabrian.
 Rawalpindi: Bhabra Bazar is named after them.
 Mianwali: A well known cast still present in majority there nowadays.

Some also lived in Sindh.

Jain temples

Punjab

 Jain temple, Thari Bhabrian Lahore City.
 Jain Digambar Temple, Old Anarkali Jain Mandir Chawk: This temple was destroyed in the riots of 1992. an Islamic school was run from the former temple. . it was completely demolished in 2016, to make for construction of Lahore Metro and a Public Square.

Sindh

 Nagar Bazaar temple is present in the main bazar of the Nangar Parkar town. The structure of the temple, including the shikhar and the torana gateway is completely intact. It was apparently in use until the independence of Pakistan in 1947, and perhaps for some years even after that. There is also a ruined temple outside of the town.
 Bhodesar Jain mandir, 7.2 km from Nagar, was the region's capital during Sodha rule. Remains of three temples, are present. In 1897, two of them were being used as cattle stalls and the third had holes in the back. The oldest temple, was built in the classical style with stones without any mortar, built around 9th century. It is built on a high platform and reached by a series of steps carved into the rock. It has beautifully carved huge stone columns and other structural elements. The remaining walls are unstable and partially collapsed. Parts of the building had been dismantled by the locals who used the bricks to construct their homes. It is perhaps the most spectacular of the monuments in Sindh. The two other Jain temples are said to have been built in 1375 CE and 1449 CE built of kanjur and redstone, with fine carvings and corbelled domes.
 Karoonjar Jain mandir is at the base of the mountain.
 Virvah Jain mandir, are a number of ruins of Jain temples here. One of the temples had 27 devakulikas in it. The ruins of legendary Parinagar are nearby. One of the temples is in good preservation.
 Virvah Gori mandir is 14 miles from Viravah. The legendary temple with 52 subsidiary shrines was built in AD 1375–6. It is dedicated to Jain tirthankar Gori Parshvanatha.
 Jain Shwetamber Temple with Shikhar, Ranchore Line, Karachi
 Jain Shwetamber Temple, Hyderabad, Sindh

Notable people
Prominent pre-partition Jains from Pakistan:

 Baba Dharam Dass
 Gulu Lalvani
 Vijayanandsuri

References

External links
List of Jain Temples in Pakistan
Baba Dharam Dass Tomb in Pasrur

 
Jain communities